Ronald Jose Méndez Garcia (born October 26, 1982) is a volleyball player from Venezuela, who won the gold medal with the men's national team at the 2003 Pan American Games in Santo Domingo, Dominican Republic. In the final Méndez' team defeated Cuba 3–0 (25–23, 25–18, 25–20).

He was born in Ciudad Bolívar, Bolívar, Venezuela.

References

External links
 FIVB Profile

1982 births
Living people
Venezuelan men's volleyball players
Olympic volleyball players of Venezuela
Volleyball players at the 2008 Summer Olympics
Volleyball players at the 2003 Pan American Games
Pan American Games gold medalists for Venezuela
People from Ciudad Bolívar
Pan American Games medalists in volleyball
Medalists at the 2003 Pan American Games
20th-century Venezuelan people
21st-century Venezuelan people